The Scottish Women's Football Annual Awards is an award ceremony hosted by Scottish Women's Football (SWF), the governing body for women's association football in Scotland. The inaugural award ceremony, sponsored by The Scottish Sun, took place in 2009 at Hampden Park.

The 2018 edition, which was the first since 2013, was sponsored by MG Alba and it was held at the Hilton Glasgow Hotel; the 2019 awards were also held in Glasgow, at the nearby Marriott Hotel.

Scottish Women's Premier League Player of the Year

SWPL Players' Player of the Year 
The SWPL Players' Player of the Year award was not awarded in 2018 or 2019.

International Team Player of the Year

SWPL Golden Boot
Top goalscorer awards for each division, first awarded in 2017.

SWPL1

SWPL2

Head Coach / Manager of the Year

Team of the Year

Special awards

Scottish Women's Player of the Month 
Clubs in every senior SWPL / SWFL division in Scottish football voted for their player of the match. PSL Team Sports sponsored the Player of the Month awards. At the end of the month, the player with the most votes in each division received a branded match football to mark their achievement. The winners also received a £50 voucher from PSL Team Sports for their club. The Player of the Month award winners for season 2013 made up the shortlist for the Divisional Awards at the 2013 SWF Player of the Year Awards.

See also

 List of sports awards honoring women

References

Awards
Awards
Women
Women's association football trophies and awards
Awards established in 2009
2009 establishments in Scotland